The Men's 10 m synchro platform competition of the 2014 European Aquatics Championships was held on 20 August.

Results
The preliminary round was held at 12:00 and the final at 16:00.

References

2014 European Aquatics Championships